Johannes Kretz (born 8 May 1968 in Vienna) is an Austrian composer and teacher for computer music and music theory. He lives and works in Vienna and created various compositions in the fields of new music, among those: music theatre, orchestra works, chamber music, sacred music and works with electronics. He won an Austrian State Prize for music in 2004.

Prizes 
 Prize of Delz foundation, Switzerland 2001
 Theodor Körner Prize 2003
 Austrian State Prize 2004

References

External links  
 Music Information Center Austria
 Personal Website of Johannes Kretz
 International Cultural Platform

Austrian classical composers
20th-century classical composers
21st-century classical composers
Living people
1968 births
Musicians from Vienna
University of Vienna alumni
Austrian male classical composers
Theodor Körner Prize recipients
20th-century male musicians
21st-century male musicians